Coffee Precinct is one of the eight precincts of Wabash County, Illinois. Keensburg, Illinois is the seat of the precinct.

Adjacent townships and precincts

Wabash County, IL
 Bellmont Precinct (northwest)
 Compton Precinct (west)
 Mount Carmel Precinct (north)

Gibson County
 Montgomery Township (east)
 Wabash Township (south and southeast)

Precincts in Wabash County, Illinois